Jupiter LIX, provisionally known as S/2017 J 1, is an outer natural satellite of Jupiter on a retrograde orbit. It was reported on June 5, 2017 via a Minor Planet Electronic Circular from the Minor Planet Center. It is believed to be about 2 km in diameter.

It is a member of the Pasiphae group. It has an average orbital distance of 23,547,105 km, with an inclination of 149.2 degrees. Its period is 734.2 days.

References

Pasiphae group
Moons of Jupiter
Irregular satellites
Discoveries by Scott S. Sheppard
20170224
Moons with a retrograde orbit